Calling Lake Provincial Park is a provincial park in Alberta, Canada. The marshy shores of the lake provide nesting grounds for waterfowl and habitat for American white pelicans and great blue herons.

Activities
Activities in the park include bird watching, camping, canoeing, swimming, other beach and water-related sports and fishing for longnose sucker, northern pike, shiner, cisco, walleye and yellow perch.

A campground and day-use area is located in the hamlet of Calling Lake.

See also
List of provincial parks in Alberta
List of Canadian provincial parks
List of National Parks of Canada

References

External links

Calling Lake Tourism www.AthabascaCountry.com

Municipal District of Opportunity No. 17
Provincial parks of Alberta